Kodiak Station is a census-designated place (CDP) in Kodiak Island Borough, Alaska, United States. At the 2020 census the population was 1,673, up from 1,301 in 2010.

Geography
Kodiak Station is located at  (57.750215, -152.506441).

Demographics

Kodiak Station first appeared on the 1970 U.S. Census as an unincorporated military base. In 1980, it was reclassified as a census-designated place (CDP).

As of the census of 2000, there were 1,840 people, 492 households, and 481 families residing in the CDP. There were 536 housing units at an average density of 22.9/sq mi (8.8/km2). The racial makeup of the CDP was 87.88% White, 3.64% Black or African American, 1.96% Native American, 1.03% Asian, 0.38% Pacific Islander, 2.45% from other races, and 2.66% from two or more races.  5.54% of the population were Hispanic or Latino of any race.

There were 492 households, out of which 76.2% had children under the age of 18 living with them, 93.9% were married couples living together, 1.8% had a female householder with no husband present, and 2.2% were non-families. 2.0% of all households were made up of individuals, and none had someone living alone who was 65 years of age or older.  The average household size was 3.55 and the average family size was 3.59.

In the CDP, the population was spread out, with 41.5% under the age of 18, 11.2% from 18 to 24, 45.1% from 25 to 44, and 2.2% from 45 to 64.  The median age was 24 years. For every 100 females, there were 107.7 males.  For every 100 females age 18 and over, there were 117.8 males.

The median income for a household in the CDP was $46,189, and the median income for a family was $45,762. Males had a median income of $27,383 versus $23,047 for females. The per capita income for the CDP was $14,234.  None of the families and none of the population were living below the poverty line, including no under eighteens and none of those over 64.

References

Census-designated places in Alaska
Census-designated places in Kodiak Island Borough, Alaska
Populated coastal places in Alaska on the Pacific Ocean